The VI Bolivarian Games (Spanish: Juegos Bolivarianos) were a multi-sport event held between August 22 - September 6, 1970, at the Estadio Olímpico del Complejo Polideportivo in Maracaibo, Venezuela. The Games were organized by the Bolivarian Sports Organization (ODEBO).

The Games were officially opened by Venezuelan president Rafael Caldera.  Torch lighter was javelin thrower José "Pachencho" Romero, who won the first gold medal ever in athletics for Venezuela at the 1947–48 Bolivarian Games.  The olympic stadium in Maracaibo was later named after him.  The athlete's oath was sworn by athlete Brígido Iriarte, who the gold medal in pentathlon at the 1951 Bolivarian Games.

A detailed history of the early editions of the Bolivarian Games between 1938 and 1989 was published in a book written (in Spanish) by José Gamarra Zorrilla, former president of the Bolivian Olympic Committee, and first president (1976-1982) of ODESUR.  Gold medal winners from Ecuador were published by the Comité Olímpico Ecuatoriano.

Participation 
About 1122 Athletes from 6 countries were reported to participate:

Sports 
The following 17 sports were explicitly mentioned:<ref
name=coe/>  For the first time, softball was included.  On the other hand, initially scheduled events in sailing, chess, and table tennis were cancelled.

Aquatic sports 
 Diving
 Swimming
 Athletics
 Baseball
 Basketball
 Boxing
Cycling 
 Road cycling
 Track cycling
 Equestrian
 Fencing
 Football
 Gymnastics (artistic)
 Judo
 Softball
 Shooting
 Tennis
 Volleyball
 Weightlifting
 Wrestling

Medal count
The medal count for these Games is tabulated below.  A slightly different number of medals (without Bolivia) was published elsewhere.  This table is sorted by the number of gold medals earned by each country.  The number of silver medals is taken into consideration next, and then the number of bronze medals.

References 

Bolivarian Games
Bolivarian Games
Bolivarian Games
Bolivarian Games
B
Multi-sport events in Venezuela
Sports competitions in Maracaibo
20th century in Maracaibo
September 1970 sports events in South America
August 1970 sports events in South America